Carl Fredrik Bunæs (16 October 1939 – 6 October 2022) was a Norwegian sprint runner.

Career
Bunæs was born in Drammen on 16 October 1939. He competed in 100 metres and 200 metres at the 1960 Summer Olympics in Rome, reaching the quarter finals in both events. 

He won a total of 18 individual titles at the Norwegian Athletics Championships between 1957 and 1966, in 100 metres, 200 metres and 400 metres.

Bunæs died in Oslo on 6 October 2022, at the age of 82.

References

External links
 

1939 births
2022 deaths
Sportspeople from Drammen
Norwegian male sprinters
Olympic athletes of Norway
Athletes (track and field) at the 1960 Summer Olympics
Norwegian Athletics Championships winners